Vijai Singh Mankotia is an Indian politician and member of the Indian National Congress. Mankotia was the member of the Himachal Pradesh Legislative Assembly from the Shahpur constituency in Kangra district on Janata Dal and Indian National Congress ticket. He is arch-rival of Chief Minister of Himachal Pradesh Virbhadra Singh.

References 

People from Kangra, Himachal Pradesh
Indian National Congress politicians
Janata Dal politicians
Bahujan Samaj Party politicians
Living people
21st-century Indian politicians
Year of birth missing (living people)
Himachal Pradesh MLAs 1982–1985
Himachal Pradesh MLAs 1985–1990
Himachal Pradesh MLAs 1990–1992
Himachal Pradesh MLAs 1993–1998
Himachal Pradesh MLAs 2003–2007